Bertram is a suburb of Perth, Western Australia, located within the City of Kwinana. Bertram derives its name from the family name of a Group Settler of the 1920s who owned land in the area. It was established as a locality name on 17 December 1998.

Bertram has seen a recent spate of growth with the development of a small shopping centre, the opening of the Mandurah railway line with a station in the suburb and continued land releases within the Belgravia Central estate.

The local public school is Bertram Primary, it first opened its doors in 2007 with 250 students and is an Official Apple distinguished school.

References

External links

Suburbs of Perth, Western Australia
Suburbs in the City of Kwinana